Vincent Emmy Mugabo, is a Ugandan lawyer and judge, who, on 4 October 2019, was nominated to sit on the Uganda High Court.

Background and education
He graduated from the Faculty of Law of Makerere University, Uganda's largest and oldest public university, with a Bachelor of Laws. He also holds a Diploma in Legal Practice by the Law Development Centre in Kampala, Uganda's capital city.

Career
In 2000, Mugabo ascended to the bench as a Grade One Magistrate. Over time, he rose through the ranks. At the time he was appointed to the High Court, he was the Registrar of the Uganda Supreme Court. He concurrently served as the Public Relations Officer of the Uganda Judiciary.

See also
Irene Mulyagonja
Monica Mugenyi
Ministry of Justice and Constitutional Affairs (Uganda)

References

External links
Museveni Names 15 Judges, Sends IGG Irene Mulyagonja to Court of Appeal As of 5 October 2019.

}

21st-century Ugandan judges
1974 births
Living people
Makerere University alumni
Law Development Centre alumni
People from Western Region, Uganda
Justices of the High Court of Uganda